Provincial elections were held in the Pakistani province of Punjab to elect the 15th Provincial Assembly of the Punjab on 18 February 2008, alongside nationwide general elections and three other provincial elections in Sindh, Balochistan and North-West Frontier Province. The remaining two territories of Pakistan, AJK and Gilgit-Baltistan, were ineligible to vote due to their disputed status.

Results

Aftermath
In the 2008 elections, the PML (N) and the PPP formed a coalition government, with PML (N) as the senior party and Shehbaz Sharif as Chief Minister of Punjab. However, in 2011, the PPP was expelled from this coalition due to corruption in the Federal Government, (which was led by the PPP at the time).

References

2008 elections in Pakistan
Elections in Punjab, Pakistan
2008 in Pakistani politics